Hugh Patrick Lygon (2 November 190419 August 1936) was the second son of William Lygon, 7th Earl Beauchamp, and, though often believed to be the inspiration for Lord Sebastian Flyte in Evelyn Waugh's Brideshead Revisited, Waugh told the Lygon family that this was not the case. He was a friend of the writer's at Oxford (A. L. Rowse believed the two to be lovers), where both were members of the Hypocrites' Club (Lygon was also the president of the club), along with their contemporary Robert Byron, Murray Andrew McLean and the Plunket Greene brothers, Richard and David. David Plunket Greene was a good friend of Hugh Lygon.

Education

He was educated at Eton and Pembroke College, Oxford. While at Oxford, Lygon was part of the Railway Club, which included: Henry Yorke, Roy Harrod, Henry Thynne, 6th Marquess of Bath, David Plunket Greene, Edward Henry Charles James Fox-Strangways, 7th Earl of Ilchester, Brian Howard, Michael Parsons, 6th Earl of Rosse, John Sutro, Hugh Lygon, Harold Acton, Bryan Guinness, 2nd Baron Moyne, Patrick Balfour, 3rd Baron Kinross, Mark Ogilvie-Grant, John Drury-Lowe.

After leaving Oxford he worked in a bank in Paris before working in the City.

Death
Lygon died in Germany, where he was on a motoring tour with his friend, the artist Henry Wynn (a son of Lady Newborough). Lygon was standing in the road to ask the way and fell backwards, hitting his head on a stone. He died later due to a fractured skull, having spent four days in a hospital in Rothenburg ob der Tauber. His body was returned to England.

References

1904 births
1936 deaths
People educated at Eton College
Alumni of Pembroke College, Oxford
Younger sons of earls
Hugh
20th-century English LGBT people